Mouy-Bury is a railway station located in the communes of Angy and Mouy near Bury in the Oise department, France.  The station is served by TER Hauts-de-France trains from Creil to Beauvais.

References

Railway stations in Oise
Railway stations in France opened in 1857